The House of Putyatin, also romanized Poutiatine, Putjatin, Putiatin, is a Rurikid family with princely and noble lines. They branched from the dukes of the autonomous principality of Drutsk, sometime in mid-15th century.

Notable figures of the princely family
 Prince Nikolai Putyatin, Russian philanthropist and philosopher.
 Duke Mikiitta Iivananpoika Putjatin settled after mid-15th century to the service of Moscow and received estates from Ivan III
 Duke Taavetti Mikiitanpoika Putjatin held in the beginning of the 16th century a remarkable bunch of landed estates in Karelia of Käkisalmi in eastern Finland. He is ancestor of all the presently living members of the princely family of Putjatin. The taxation register of Vatja from the year 1500 lists several of his holdings.
 Prince Sergei Putjatin, the second husband of Grand Duchess Maria Pavlovna the younger (1890–1958)

Members of other (non-princely) Putiatin families
 Yevfimy Putyatin, Russian admiral. He was not a member of the princely family which were Rurikids, instead the admiral came from another family with the same surname

References
 Wilhelm HOSÄUS, Fürst Putiatin, 1749-1830, in Mitteilungen des Vereins für Anhaltische Geschichte und Altertumskunde (MittVAGA), 1883, S. 461
 Juhana Vilhelm Ronimus (1906), Novgorodin Vatjalaisen viidenneksen verokirja v. 1500 ja Karjalan silloinen asutus. Joensuu 1906.  Imperial Alexander University in Helsinki, Finland
 Detlev Schwennicke, Europäische Stammtafeln, vol III/5, p 916-917
 Jacques Ferrand (1979), vol I, p 84

Rurikids
Russian noble families